The Great Missouri Raid is a 1951 American Western film directed by Gordon Douglas and written by Frank Gruber. The film stars Wendell Corey, Macdonald Carey, Ellen Drew, Ward Bond, Bruce Bennett, Bill Williams and Anne Revere. The film was released on February 15, 1951, by Paramount Pictures.

Plot
In Missouri during the final days of the Civil War, brothers Frank (Wendell Corey) and Jesse James (Macdonald Carey) engage in a skirmish with Union soldiers, killing one before fleeing. After the war's end, amnesty is declared, but the brothers are betrayed by Union officer Maj. Trowbridge (Ward Bond), whose brother they killed. Along with the Younger brothers, Frank and Jesse turn to robbing banks, while Trowbridge, still bent on revenge, opens a detective agency to find and stop the brothers.

Cast
		
Wendell Corey as Frank James
Macdonald Carey as Jesse James
Ellen Drew as Bee Moore
Ward Bond as Maj. Marshal Trowbridge
Bruce Bennett as Cole Younger / Steve Brill
Bill Williams as Jim Younger
Anne Revere as Mrs. Samuels
Edgar Buchanan as Dr. Samuels
Lois Chartrand as Mary Bauer
Louis Jean Heydt as Charles Ford
Barry Kelley as Mr. Bauer
James Millican as Sgt. Trowbridge
Paul Lees as Bob Younger
Guy Wilkerson as Clell Miller
Ethan Laidlaw as Jim Cummings
Tom Tyler as Allen Parmer
Steve Pendleton as Arch Clements
Robert Bray as Charlie Pitts 
Paul Fix as Sgt. Brill
James Griffith as Jack Ladd
Robert Osterloh as August
Alan Wells as Dick Liddil
Whit Bissell as Bob Ford

Production

The railroad scenes were filmed on the Sierra Railroad in Tuolumne County, California.

References

External links

 

1951 films
Paramount Pictures films
American Western (genre) films
1951 Western (genre) films
Films directed by Gordon Douglas
Biographical films about Jesse James
James–Younger Gang
Films scored by Paul Sawtell
Revisionist Western (genre) films
1950s English-language films
1950s American films